Hephæstus was a town in Roman Egypt, in the province of Augustamnica Prima, the eastern part of the Nile Delta.

The name Hephæstus is known only from ecclesiastical sources; its Egyptian name and its site are unknown.

Ecclesiastical history

The original diocese was in Augustamnica Prima, a suffragan of Pelusium.

It is mentioned by Hierocles and by George of Cyprus, as among the thirteen towns of Augustamnica Prima.

Le Quien mentions only two bishops: John, who took part in two Councils of Ephesus (First, 431 and Second, 449), and Peter, present at the Council of Constantinople in 459.

It remains a Roman Catholic titular see.

Notes

Sources
 The entry cites:
Heinrich Gelzer, Georgii Cyprii descriptio orbis romani (Leipzig, 1890), 112; 
Smith, Dict. Greek and Roman Geogr., s. v.

Catholic titular sees in Africa
Roman sites in Egypt